The Genesis G70 is a four-door compact executive sedan manufactured by the Korean luxury automaker Genesis, which is owned by Hyundai Motor Company.

The G70 debuted on September 15, 2017, at a global launch event in Seoul's Olympic Park. The G70 is Genesis Motor's third model and was designed to compete with compact executive and entry-level luxury saloons/sedans. The Genesis G70 was named the 2019 North American Car of the Year.

Overview
The Genesis G70 was under development for several years and was previewed by the Genesis New York Concept shown at the 2016 New York International Auto Show. The design was penned by German auto designer Peter Schreyer, who is also responsible for designing the related Kia Stinger. Development of the G70 took place at Hyundai Namyang R&D Center in Hwasung, South Korea.

The exterior design shares cues from the other two Genesis models, the G80 and the G90. The grille features Genesis' corporate design, with functional air intakes along the bottom and side. The LED headlights operate with separate daytime running lights. The rear has an athletic stance framed by LED taillights and dual-exhausts.

The interior's center console is constructed out of soft-touch plastics, leather & genuine metal accents that are slightly angled towards the driver.  The layout has three large knobs for the climate controls, an eight-inch touch screen, and a small electronic shifter. Technology features include a 15-speaker 660W Lexicon audio system, 8-inch infotainment screen with Apple CarPlay, Android Auto support and a heads-up display. The interior appointments on the G70 include quilted leather seating surfaces, along with brushed aluminum and stainless steel trim.

Yearly changes

2019 
In 2019, the electronic parking brake was made standard, and an optional electric power trunk became available to buyers. A 12.3-inch (31.2 cm) 3D gauge cluster also became an option for South Korean-market 3.3T-equipped G70s.

2020
Changes include offering the 12.3-inch 3D gauge cluster as an option to the 2.0T model, as well as making it an option to export markets. In 2020, the 3D gauge cluster was made available to export markets and became an option for 2.0T-equipped G70s. A carbon fiber package was made optional in South Korea, which includes carbon fiber-appointed outside mirrors and interior trim.

Facelift
On September 8, 2020, Genesis announced a facelift G70, which went on sale in the South Korean market on October 20, 2020. The facelift incorporates new corporate design cues from the GV80 crossover SUV and second generation G80 sedan, including new front and rear bumpers, headlights, taillights, and a new grille design. Interior changes include an optional 10.25 inch (26 cm) infotainment screen with Android Auto and Apple CarPlay features. Whereas the changes were generally well-received in the North American market, the changes were polarizing in the Korean market. Many evaluations were saying that the design of the previous model was better, and in particular, the taillights were criticized for looking forcibly inserted.

The facelift G70 was released as a 2022 model in the United States, where the optional manual transmission was also discontinued.

Shooting Brake 

In May 2021, Genesis introduced a station wagon version of the G70 specifically for European markets, called the Shooting Brake. The rear end has undergone the biggest changes, where the roof is longer and slightly sloping. The trunk space is slightly larger than the sedan. Powertrain options are either a 2.0L turbocharged Theta II gasoline engine or a 2.2L R II diesel engine, both of which are mated to an 8-speed automatic transmission. Interior and exterior images of the G70 Shooting Brake were unveiled on May 12, 2021.

The G70 Shooting Brake went on sale in Europe in the second half of 2021. In South Korea, it was officially released on June 27, 2022. The models are included in the Gasoline 2.0 Turbo Premium and Gasoline 2.0 Turbo Sport Package. It expands the open area by moving the trunk junction forward based on the appearance of the existing G70 model. 4:2:4 seats and 465 liters of basic trunk space were applied, securing a maximum loading space of 1,535 liters. It is equipped with 10 airbag systems, front collision prevention assistance, rear-seat passenger notification, and lane maintenance assistance. In addition 10.25-inch display, Genesis Carplay, and voice recognition vehicle control technology are applied.

Powertrain 
Genesis estimates that acceleration from  will take 4.7 seconds with the LSD equipped 3.3 litre V-6 RWD model. The transmission is either an 8-speed automatic or a 6-speed manual, which is only available on the 2.0 litre 4-cylinder model. Buyers are able to choose between rear-wheel drive and all-wheel drive, with the manual transmission coming only with rear-wheel drive.

Starting with the 2022 model year, the manual transmission is no longer offered.

Safety

Euro NCAP test results for a LHD, five door shooting brake variant on a registration from 2021:

Awards
 Best Luxury Sedan for 2019 – Ruedas ESPN (10/18)
 2019 Car of the Year – MotorTrend (11/18)
 10Best list – Car and Driver (11/18)
 Best Deluxe Car – Hispanic Motor Press (11/18)
 IIHS Top Safety Pick + (12/18)
 North American Car of the Year – Detroit Auto Show (01/19)
 2019 Car of the Year – AutoGuide (01/19)
 Shift Award – 2019 Vehicle of the Year – Roadshow by CNET (01/19)
 Overall Best of 2019 – Cars.com (02/19)
 2019 Driver's Choice – Best Luxury Car – MotorWeek (02/19)
 2019 Sport Sedan of the Year – Esquire (03/19)
 2019 Best New Car – Autotrader (04/19)
 2019 Sedan of the Year – Popular Mechanics (04/19)
 2019 Best New Car – Luxury Sedan – Good Housekeeping (04/19)
 2019 10 Best Interior – Ward's Auto (05/19)
 2019 Best Panoramic Sunroof Sedan – Southern Automotive Media Association's (05/19)
 2019 Best Winter Sedan – New England Motor Press Association (05/19)
 2020 Best New Family Car Award Winner – Luxury Sedan – Good Housekeeping (04/20)

Sales

Notes

References

External links

G70
Mid-size cars
Sports sedans
Luxury vehicles
Rear-wheel-drive vehicles
All-wheel-drive vehicles
Cars introduced in 2017
Compact executive cars
Euro NCAP executive cars
2020s cars
Cars powered by longitudinal 4-cylinder engines